Zhang Yichan (born 11 February 1991) is a female Chinese volleyball player.

She participated at the 2013 FIVB Volleyball Women's U23 World Championship,  and 2018 FIVB Volleyball Women's Nations League.

Clubs 
  Shanghai (2007 - present)

References

External links 

 FIVB profile
 FIVB youth profile
 

1991 births
Living people
Chinese women's volleyball players
Wing spikers
Universiade silver medalists for China
Universiade medalists in volleyball
Medalists at the 2011 Summer Universiade
21st-century Chinese women